Manton is a locality in the Yass Valley Council, New South Wales, Australia. It lies on both sides of both the Hume Highway and the Barton Highway to the east of their intersection about 10 km to the east of Yass.

References

Yass Valley Council
Localities in New South Wales
Southern Tablelands